Shenkel Island is a small island in the Sacramento–San Joaquin River Delta. It is part of San Joaquin County, California.

References

Islands of San Joaquin County, California
Islands of the Sacramento–San Joaquin River Delta
Islands of Northern California